Lønset Church is a parish church of the Church of Norway in Oppdal municipality in Trøndelag county, Norway. It is located in the village of Lønset, along the Norwegian National Road 70 in the western part of the municipality. It is the church for the Lønset parish which is part of the Gauldal prosti (deanery) in the Diocese of Nidaros.  The white, wooden church was built in an octagonal style in 1863 using plans drawn up by the architect Sjur Jamtseter and the carpenter J. Rønningen. The church seats about 250 people.

History
The church was built during the middle ages and it likely fell into ruin after the Black death when the Lønset area was depopulated. For a few centuries there was no church in use in Lønset. From 1772 to 1774 a new church was once again built in Lønset. In 1858, a committee was formed that would work on planning for a new church at Lønset because the old church was too small. Two solutions were outlined: a cruciform church designed by John Elliott Storli or an octagonal church designed by Sjur Jamtseter. The committee chose the octagonal design. The last worship service there was on Sunday, 19 July 1863 and after that, the old church was torn down. The new church was built on the same site and it was consecrated on 26 August 1863.

Media gallery

See also
List of churches in Nidaros

References

Oppdal
Churches in Trøndelag
Octagonal churches in Norway
Wooden churches in Norway
19th-century Church of Norway church buildings
Churches completed in 1863
1774 establishments in Norway